Darantasia mesosema is a moth of the family Erebidae. It is found on the Bacan Islands.

References

Nudariina
Moths described in 1914